The Battle of the Kodori Valley was a military operation during the Russo-Georgian War in the Upper Kodori Valley of Abkhazia, a breakaway region of Georgia. It was the only part of Abkhazia under Georgian control before this military conflict. On 9 August 2008, the Abkhaz military, with support by Russian forces, launched an operation to remove the remaining Georgian troops from the disputed gorge. After three days, the Georgian military left the Upper Kodori Valley.

Abkhaz and Russian army mobilization
Russia sent naval vessels to blockade Georgia's Black Sea coast. According to the Russian Navy, a group of ships from Russia's Black Sea Fleet, including the flagship Moskva missile cruiser, arrived on 10 August 2008 near the Georgian border. The source in the Russian Navy's headquarters claimed, that "the purpose of the Black Sea Fleet vessels' presence in this region is to provide aid to refugees." A spokesman of the president of Abkhazia earlier said, that "the local administration and peacekeepers had asked Russia to reinforce its naval presence near the Abkhazian coast, after Georgian warships attempted to approach the coastline."

On 10 August 2008, the Georgian government said that 6,000 Russian troops had rolled into South Ossetia from the neighbouring Russian province of North Ossetia and 4,000 more landed in Abkhazia. Alexander Novitsky, an aide to the commander of Russian peacekeepers in Abkhazia, said on 11 August 2008, that Russia had boosted its forces in Abkhazia and had more than 9,000 paratroopers and 350 armoured vehicles there.

Ultimatum to Georgia
On the morning of 9 August 2008, the Abkhaz de facto deputy defense minister requested, that UNOMIG should withdraw its observers from the Upper Kodori Valley. UNOMIG then withdrew all 15 observers from the Upper Kodori Valley. The Abkhaz de facto authorities announced a decision, taken by president Bagapsh, to expel the Georgian armed forces from the Upper Kodori Valley. On the afternoon, UNOMIG reported aerial bombardments of Georgian villages in the Upper Kodori Valley. On 10 August, the president of Abkhazia, Sergei Bagapsh, gave a press conference where he announced that their operation in the Upper Kodori Valley was proceeding according to plan. He gave both Georgian civilians and armed personnel an ultimatum to leave the Upper Kodori Valley. He also said, that the government of Abkhazia had requested Russia to take measures to strengthen the Abkhaz maritime border. Bagapsh said, that his decision to start a military operation against the Upper Kodori Valley was approved by the parliament.

Fighting
On 9 August 2008, Russian-supported separatists in Abkhazia launched air and artillery strikes to drive Georgian troops out of the Kodori gorge, the only part of Abkhazia controlled by Georgia before this war. A "second front" against Georgia was opened. The Itar-Tass news agency quoted the foreign minister of Abkhazia Sergei Shamba as saying that the armed forces of Abkhazia had begun an operation to force Georgian troops out of the upper part of the Kodori Gorge. In a separate report by Interfax news agency, Sergei Bagapsh said, that its "aviation is currently conducting an operation in the upper part of the Kodori Gorge of Abkhazia controlled by Georgia." Shamba also said, "Today was only the initial part of the operation by heavy artillery supported by aviation." Georgian president Mikheil Saakashvili was quoted by the Itar-Tass agency as saying that Georgia had defeated all attacks on the upper part of the Kodori Gorge. On 10 August Abkhaz warplanes and artillery continued to pound Georgian positions for a second day in a row. Bagapsh said, Abkhazia was acting "independently". The separatist authorities of Abkhazia announced a full military mobilisation. The president of Abkhazia said, that "around 1,000 special Abkhaz troops" were involved in operations against Georgian forces. They were attacking the Georgians using "warplanes, multiple rocket launchers and artillery." "The operation will enter the next phase as planned. And you will learn about that," he said, adding that he would create a "humanitarian corridor", allowing residents to flee. On 11 August 2008, the Abkhaz defense minister, Mirab Kishmaria, told the Russian news agency Interfax, that Abkhaz forces would kill Georgian troops, if they did not leave Kodori gorge.

On 12 August 2008, Abkhaz authorities announced a military offensive against Georgian troops in the Kodori gorge. Russian forces supported the Abkhaz operation. "The operation to liberate Kodori gorge has started," Abkhazia's foreign minister, Sergei Shamba, said. "Our troops are making advances. We are hoping for success." Shamba claimed, that Russian troops were not involved in the operation.

Georgian military left the gorge on 12 August 2008. Georgia's Deputy Interior Minister, Eka Zhguladze, said, that Georgian troops had withdrawn from the Kodori gorge as a "goodwill gesture." Abkhaz Deputy Defense Minister, Major General Anatoly Zaitsev, claimed, that "only local forces - not Russian ones" were involved in the military operation. But an AP reporter in the area saw 135 Russian military vehicles driving to the Kodori gorge. Georgian officials said, their troops in the Kodori gorge were being attacked by Russians. On 13 August 2008, president Sergei Bagapsh flew into the gorge by helicopter to declare, that the last piece of Georgian-held land in Abkhazia was back under the control of the separatist authorities. Abkhaz soldiers said, that they had discovered a "mountain of weapons", from American M-16 rifles to artillery units and mortars, as well as herds of abandoned cattle.

Casualties and war damages
One Abkhaz soldier was mistakenly killed by his own men. Two Georgian soldiers were also killed.

Before the war, around 2,000 people lived in the Upper Kodori Valley, that fled during the Georgian retreat. The Abkhaz authorities said that they advised the return of the refugees, but by late March 2009, only 130 people were reported to live in the Upper Kodori Valley.

According to visitors to Azhara, military posts had been damaged and shops looted, but houses were almost unharmed.

Operations outside Abkhazia
The Russian ultimatum, issued on 11 August 2008 by the commander of Russian peacekeeping forces in Abkhazia, Major General Sergei Chaban, called for Georgian troops to disarm in the Zugdidi district along the boundary with Abkhazia. Russia stated, the ultimatum expired at 06:00 GMT. Sergei Chaban said, that the Russian troops were ready for an operation to disarm Georgian troops in the area.

On 11 August 2008, Russian paratroopers, deployed in Abkhazia, occupied the city of Zugdidi and carried out raids against military bases deep in western Georgia. That day, Russian forces, meeting virtually no resistance, entered the town of Senaki and seized the military base. Georgian Deputy Defense Minister Batu Kutelia said, that about 30 armored personnel carriers and more than 20 trucks with Russian soldiers entered Senaki and took control of the military base.
Russian Defense Ministry announced that "operations" were carried out in Senaki. "Operations aimed to prevent new attack of Georgian artillery against peacekeepers of Russia and South Ossetia," the report said. The source insisted that they aimed to prevent mobilization of reservists. Shota Utiashvili, spokesman for Interior Ministry of Georgia said, that Russian peacekeepers and Abkhaz separatists had entered Khurcha village of Zugdidi District. Abkhaz separatists declined the information.

An aide to the commander of Russian forces, Alexander Novitsky, said, that during a reconnaissance mission, the Russian Air Force destroyed two Georgian helicopters at the Senaki airbase. The helicopters were purportedly identified as a MI-8 and a MI-24, belonging to the Georgian Air Force. Russians destroyed the base in Senaki, and seized rich trophies.

On 12 August 2008, Russian troops also drove through the port of Poti and took up positions around it.

On 16 August 2008, the Georgian Ministry of Foreign Affairs said, that the Russian army units and the separatists moved the border of Abkhazia in direction to the Inguri River. The troops occupied 13 villages in Georgia, set up temporary administration there and put the Inguri River hydropower plant under Abkhaz control.

See also
Abkhaz-Georgian conflict
Ethnic cleansing of Georgians in Abkhazia

References

2008 in Abkhazia
2008 in Georgia (country)
Kodori Valley
Russo-Georgian War
August 2008 events in Asia